Diaspora Problems is the fourth studio album by American hardcore punk band Soul Glo. The album was released on March 25, 2022 through Epitaph Records, their first release with the label.

Two singles were released ahead of the album: "Jump! (Or Get Jumped by the Future!)" and "Driponomics".

Critical reception 

Diaspora Problems received critical acclaim upon its release. On review aggregator website Metacritic, Diaspora Problems has an average rating of 86 out of 100, indicating "universal acclaim based on nine critic reviews". On review aggregator Album of the Year, Diaspora Problems received a "Must Hear Album" designation and holds an average rating of 84 out of 100 based upon 11 critic reviews. On AnyDecentMusic?, the album has an average of 8.0 out of 10 rating based on eight critic reviews.

Year-end lists

Track listing

Personnel 
The following individuals were credited for their roles in the recording, composition, or mastering of the album.
Soul Glo
 GG Guerra — Bass, vocals, programming
 Pierce Jordan — Vocals
 Ruben Polo — Guitar
 T. J. Stevenson — Drums

Additional musicians 
 Bearcat — Vocals (on "The Things I Carry")
 Hakim Diran — Saxophone (on "Thumbsucker" and "Spiritual Level of Gang Shit")
 McKinley Dixon — Vocals (on "Spiritual Level of Gang Shit")
 Dave Heck — Trombone (on "Thumbsucker" and "Spiritual Level of Gang Shit")
 Kathryn Edwards — Vocals (on "John J")
 Lojii — Vocals (on "Spiritual Level of Gang Shit")
 Mother Maryrose — Vocals (on "Driponomics")
 Noah Roth — Trumpet (on "Thumbsucker" and "Spiritual Level of Gang Shit")
 Zula Wildheart — Vocals (on "John J")

Recording and Mastering

 Evan Bernard — Assistant production, engineering
 GG Guerra — Production, engineering
 Noah Roth — Assistant engineering
 Will Yip — Mixing, mastering

References

External links 
 

2022 albums
Soul Glo albums
Epitaph Records albums
Albums produced by Will Yip